Trinity Theological Seminary may refer ro:

 Trinity College of the Bible and Theological Seminary
 Trinity Theological Seminary, Legon

See also 

 Trinity Seminary (disambiguation)
 Trinity Theological College (disambiguation)